Boubakary Soumaré (born 27 February 1999) is a French professional footballer who plays as a midfielder for Premier League club Leicester City. He is a former France youth international.

Club career

Early career 
In his early footballing years, Soumaré was a young player at Paris FC. He stayed at the club from 2006 to 2011, before joining the Paris Saint-Germain Academy. At PSG, he was selected for eight appearances for the B team of the club in 2017, and left later that year.

Lille 
On 7 July 2017, Soumaré signed for Lille on a three-year contract. His professional debut began with a 3–0 Ligue 1 win over Metz on 5 November 2017. At the end of the 2017–18 season, Lille managed to stay in the Ligue 1, meaning that Soumaré's contract was extended by two years, as his deal entailed such an option.

Soumaré's only goal for Lille occurred in a 2–2 away draw against Lyon on 5 May 2019.

Leicester City 

On 2 July 2021, Premier League club Leicester City signed Soumaré for an undisclosed sum on a five-year contract. He made his debut for the club with an appearance off the bench in Leicester's 1–0 triumph over reigning Premier League champions Manchester City in the FA Community Shield on 7 August 2021.

International career
Soumaré was born in France and is of Senegalese descent. He has been a young international for France at various levels.

Career statistics

Honours 
Paris Saint-Germain U19
 Championnat National U19: 2015–16

Lille
 Ligue 1: 2020–21

Leicester City
 FA Community Shield: 2021

References

External links

 Profile at the Leicester City F.C. website
 
 
 
 
 

1999 births
Living people
Footballers from Seine-Saint-Denis
French footballers
France youth international footballers
France under-21 international footballers
Association football midfielders
Paris FC players
Paris Saint-Germain F.C. players
Lille OSC players
Leicester City F.C. players
Championnat National 2 players
Ligue 1 players
Premier League players
Black French sportspeople
French sportspeople of Senegalese descent
French expatriate footballers
Expatriate footballers in England
French expatriate sportspeople in England